Vicente Cabeza de Vaca y Fernández de Córdoba, 9th Marquis of Portago (1865–1921) was a Spanish politician. A member of the Conservative Party, he served as Mayor of Madrid from 1902 to 1903 and as Minister of Public Instruction and Fine Arts in 1920.

Biography 
Born on 17 February 1865 in Madrid, son to Mariano Cabeza de Vaca y Morales and Francisca de Borja Fernández de Córdoba y Bernaldo de Quirós.

He served as civil governor of Seville. He was later elected as member of the Congress of Deputies, serving in the lower house in representation of Don Benito (Badajoz) and Granada from 1899 to 1907. He served as Director–General for Posts and Telegraphs and as (elected) municipal councillor of Madrid.

A prominent silvelista (follower of Francisco Silvela within the Conservative Party) and politically close to Eduardo Dato, he has appointed as Mayor of Madrid via Royal Order signed on 10 December 1902, serving from 23 December 1902 to 27 July 1903. His brief tenure before his replacement by the Marquis of Lema was signified by two issues: a draft for the project of Gran Vía and the tramway of El Pardo. He became Senator por derecho propio (in virtue of his nobiliary status) in 1909.

He served as Minister of Public Instruction and Fine Arts from September to December 1920, part of a cabinet presided by Dato. He retired from the post due to illness, dying in Madrid on 15 November 1921.

References 
Citations

Bibliography
 
 
 

1865 births
1921 deaths
Members of the Senate of the Spanish Restoration
Members of the Congress of Deputies of the Spanish Restoration
Mayors of Madrid
Madrid city councillors
Government ministers of Spain
Conservative Party (Spain) politicians